Roddy MacGregor (born 21 December 2001) is a Scottish professional footballer who plays for Inverness Caledonian Thistle, as a midfielder.

Club career
MacGregor began his career with Inverness Caledonian Thistle, and was one of 10 youth players to turn professional with the club in May 2018. He made his senior debut on 17 November 2018, in a 3–3 league draw away at Queen of the South.

He made a "breakthrough" with the Inverness first team in the 2019–20 season, making 20 appearances in all competitions.

He scored his first goal for Inverness on 10 November 2020, in the Scottish League Cup, in a 3–3 draw with Raith Rovers. He scored his first league goal on 4 December 2020, in a 3–0 victory against Queen of the South.

International career
On 25 May 2021, he received his first international call up, for the Scotland under-21 team for two friendlies against Northern Ireland alongside Inverness team-mates, Robbie Deas, Cameron Harper and Daniel MacKay. MacGregor made his under-21 debut in the second game, coming on as a substitute for Josh McPake in the 72nd minute.

Career statistics

References

2001 births
Living people
Scottish footballers
Inverness Caledonian Thistle F.C. players
Scottish Professional Football League players
Association football midfielders
Scotland under-21 international footballers